Mirze Ke village is situated in Firozpur tehsil in Firzopur district, Punjab. It is 25 Km away from the district headquarter Firozpur. Mirzeke village is also a Gram Panchayat.

Total population of this village is 1,197. Out of this male population is 631 and female population is 566.

Pin code of this village is 142060.

Literacy rate of this village is 59.90%.

References 

Villages in Firozpur district